The following outline is provided as an overview of and topical guide to Taoism:

Taoism – philosophical, ethical, and religious tradition of Chinese origin that emphasizes living in harmony with the Tao (also romanized as Dao). The term Tao means "way", "path" or "principle", and can also be found in Chinese philosophies and religions other than Taoism. In Taoism, however, Tao denotes something that is both the source and the driving force behind everything that exists. It is ultimately ineffable: "The Tao that can be told is not the eternal Tao." Also called Daoism.

Texts 
 Laozi (Tao Te Ching)
 Zhuangzi
 Liezi
 Daozang

Taoist beliefs and doctrines

Basic concepts
 Non-duality (Wuji) ― the holistic unity of contradictory opposites.
 Polarity (Taiji) ― the basic concept of interdependent, interpenetrating opposites coexisting and complementing one another as expressed in the ‘bright and dark’ (yin and yang) symbol. Yin, the negative, passive, (traditionally) feminine side, must interact with yang, the positive, active, (traditionally) masculine side. Without one the other cannot exist.
 Five Phases (Wu Xing) ― according to the Taoist tradition there are five basic phases or states of matter in the universe: metal, wood, fire, water, and earth. These are not literally metal, wood, fire, water, and earth but are rather metaphors for lesser-yin (shaoyin), greater-yin (taiyin), lesser-yang (shaoyang), greater-yang (taiyang), and dynamic equilibrium. Understanding how each contributes and influences one another is essential to traditional Taoist metaphysics and natural philosophy.
 Perpetual change (Bianhua) ― the concept that everything flows in a perpetual cycle of change and transformation.
 Reversal (Fan) ― the cyclical transformation of things into their opposites and back again comprising an eternal return.
 Non-action (Wu wei) ― flexibility and spontaneity of one's actions.
 Authenticity (Ziran) ― literally "self-so"; natural authenticity.
 Dao (aka Tao) ― Chinese concept signifying way, path, route, or sometimes more loosely, doctrine or principle, or as a verb, speak. Within the context of traditional Chinese philosophy and religion, Dao is a metaphysical concept originating with Laozi that gave rise to a religion (in Wade–Giles: Tao Chiao; in Pinyin: Daojiao) and philosophy (in Wade–Giles: Tao chia; in Pinyin: Daojia) referred to in English with the single term Daoism (aka Taoism). The concept of Dao was shared with Confucianism, with Chán and Zen Buddhism, and more broadly throughout East Asian philosophy and religion in general.
 Emanation from Dao:
 Wuji
 Taiji
 Yin-Yang (Liangyi)
 Sixiang
 Bagua
 The three Hun and seven Po ― the parts of the human soul which may depart causing illness and death.
 The Three Treasures ― the vital essence (jing), spirit (qi), and soul (shen) which must be refined to achieve longevity.
 Xian (Taoist immortals)
 Taoism and death

Virtues 
 Three Treasures ― basic virtues in Taoism, including variations of "compassion", "frugality", and "humility". Arthur Waley described these Three Treasures as, "The three rules that formed the practical, political side of the author's teaching (1) abstention from aggressive war and capital punishment, (2) absolute simplicity of living, (3) refusal to assert active authority."
 First of the Three Treasures: ci – compassion, tenderness, love, mercy, kindness, gentleness, benevolence.
 Second of the Three Treasures: jian – frugality, moderation, economy, restraint, be sparing. 
 Third of the Three Treasures: Bugan wei tianxia xian – "not dare to be first/ahead in the world", humility.

Ethics 
 De (Te) ― virtue arising from the Way (Dao).
 Zhenren ― a "true man" or "true person"; someone who has cultivated perfection in De and attained the Dao.
 Precepts ― commandments, instructions, or orders intended as authoritative rules of action. Religious precepts are usually commands respecting moral conduct.
 Five Precepts – constitute the basic code of ethics undertaken mainly by Taoist lay-cultivators. According to The Ultra Supreme Elder Lord's Scripture of Precepts, the five basic precepts are:
 The first precept: No murdering
 The second precept: No stealing
 The third precept: No sexual misconduct
 The fourth precept: No false speech
 The fifth precept: No taking of intoxicants
 Ten Precepts – classical rules of medieval Taoism as applied to practitioners attaining the rank of Disciple of Pure Faith. They first appeared in the Scripture on Setting the Will on Wisdom (DZ325). They were outlined in a short text that appears in Dunhuang manuscripts (DH31, 32). They are:
 The first precept: Do not kill but always be mindful of the host of living beings
 The second precept: Do not be lascivious or think depraved thoughts
 The third precept: Do not steal or receive unrighteous wealth
 The fourth precept: Do not cheat or misrepresent good and evil
 The fifth precept: Do not get intoxicated but always think of pure conduct
 The sixth precept: I will maintain harmony with my ancestors and family and never disregard my kin
 The seventh precept: When I see someone do a good deed, I will support him with joy and delight
 The eighth precept: When I see someone unfortunate, I will support him with dignity to recover good fortune
 The ninth precept: When someone comes to do me harm, I will not harbor thoughts of revenge
 The tenth precept: As long as all beings have not attained the Tao, I will not expect to do so myself

Deities in Taoism

Principle deities 
 Hongjun Laozu
 Three Pure Ones
 Yuanshi Tianzun
 Lingbao Tianzun
 Daode Tianzun
 Four Sovereigns
 Yuhuang Dadi (Great Jade Emperor)
 Zhongtian Ziwei Beiji Dadi (Great Emperor of the North Star in the Purple Forbidden enclosure at the center of Heaven)
 Gouchen Dadi (Great Emperor of the Curved Array/Little Dipper)
 Houtu Huang Diqi (Empress of the Earth)
 Three Great Emperor-Officials
 Xiwangmu (Queen Mother of the West)
 Dongwanggong (King Father of the East)
 Eight Immortals

Other deities 
 Chang'e
 Three Sovereigns and Five Emperors
 Yellow Emperor
 Guan Shengdi
 Li Hong

Taoist practices 
 Taoist meditation
 Zuowang
 Taoist alchemy
 Neidan (internal alchemy)
 Jing-Qi-Shen
 Dantian
 Waidan (external alchemy)
 Five Minerals Powder
 Bugang
 Taoist diet
 Taoist sexual practices

Taoist culture 
 Taoist priest
 Taoist music
 Taoist art
 Ink wash painting

Taoist martial arts and physical exercise 
 Taijiquan
 Taoist Tai Chi
 Daoyin ― Note: the "dao" and "yin" here are not the same Chinese words as ‘the Dao’ and ‘Yin’ as in yin-yang.
 Qigong

Sacred places 
 Grotto-heavens
 Sacred Mountains of China
 Wudang Mountains
 Mount Penglai
 Mount Kunlun
 Taoist temple
 White Cloud Temple (Baiyun Monastery)
 Louguantai Temple
 Cebu Taoist Temple
 Taoist Temple (Hanford, California)

History of Taoism 
 History of Taoism
 The Religion of China: Confucianism and Taoism

Variations of Taoism

Taoist schools 
Taoist schools
 Wudoumi Taoism
 Tianshi Taoism
 Shangqing Taoism
 Lingbao Taoism
 Quanzhen Taoism (Longmen Taoism)
 Dragon Gate Taoism
 Zhengyi Taoism
 Wuliu Taoism
 Yao Taoism

Taoism by region 
 Taoism in Hong Kong
 Taoism in Japan
 Taoism in Korea
 Taoism in Malaysia
 Taoism in Singapore
 Taoism in Vietnam

Taoist organizations 
 Chinese Taoist Association
 Celestial Master
 Hong Kong Taoist Association
 Hong Kong Taoist Association Tang Hin Memorial Secondary School
 Hong Kong Taoist Association The Yuen Yuen Institute No.2 Secondary School
 Research Association of Laozi Taoist Culture
 Malaysian Consultative Council of Buddhism, Christianity, Hinduism, Sikhism and Taoism
 Taoist Tai Chi Society

Influential Taoists 
List of Taoists
 Chen Tuan
 Ge Hong
 Laozi
 Shan Tao
 Wang Liping
 Zhang Daoling
 Zhang Jue
 Zhang Zhong
 Zhuangzi

Taoism in popular culture 
 Jeon Woo-chi: The Taoist Wizard
 Lao Mountain Taoist
 Dudeism

See also 

 Outline of religion
 Daoism–Taoism romanization issue

References

External links 

Outlines of religions
Wikipedia outlines